Pietro Camporese may refer to one of two Italian architects:
Pietro Camporese the Elder
Pietro Camporese the Younger, grandson of the above